Hwang Tae-hyeon (born 29 January 1999) is a South Korean footballer who plays as a right-back or a defensive midfielder for Seoul E-Land.

Career statistics

Club

Honours

International

South Korea U20
FIFA U-20 World Cup runner-up: 2019

References

External links
 

1999 births
Living people
Association football defenders
South Korean footballers
Ansan Greeners FC players
Daegu FC players
Seoul E-Land FC players
K League 2 players
K League 1 players
South Korea under-20 international footballers